Daniel Bozhilov Petrov (born 8 September 1971 in Varna) is a Bulgarian boxer. He won a silver medal at the Barcelona Olympics in 1992 and a gold medal at the Atlanta Olympics in 1996 in the category Light Flyweight.

Petrov began his career in Varna, Bulgaria, but then went to Slavia (Sofia). He became a champion of the country several times. In 1993 he captured the European title in Bursa, Turkey. Two years later he won the world title at the 1995 World Amateur Boxing Championships in Berlin, Germany, followed by the European title a year later in Vejle, Denmark.

Olympic results
1992
Defeated Nelson Dieppa (Puerto Rico) 10-7
Defeated O Song-chol (North Korea) RSC 3 (1:09)
Defeated Pál Lakatos (Hungary) 17-8
Defeated Jan Quast (Germany) 15-9
Lost to Rogelio Marcelo (Cuba) 10-20

1996
1st round bye
Defeated Nshan Munchyan (Armenia) 11-5
Defeated Somrot Kamsing (Thailand) 18-6
Defeated Oleg Kiryukhin (Ukraine) 17-8
Defeated Mansueto Velasco (Philippines) 19-6

References
 

1971 births
Living people
Flyweight boxers
Olympic boxers of Bulgaria
Boxers at the 1992 Summer Olympics
Boxers at the 1996 Summer Olympics
Olympic gold medalists for Bulgaria
Olympic silver medalists for Bulgaria
Sportspeople from Varna, Bulgaria
Olympic medalists in boxing
Bulgarian male boxers
AIBA World Boxing Championships medalists
Medalists at the 1996 Summer Olympics
Medalists at the 1992 Summer Olympics